Fenqing, or FQ (abbreviation), which is itself an abbreviation for Fennu Qingnian, means literally "angry youth". It mainly refers to Chinese youth who display a high level of Chinese nationalism. This term first appeared in Hong Kong in the 1970s, referring to those young people who were not satisfied with Chinese society and sought reform. It has now evolved into a term used predominantly in Internet slang. Whether fenqing is derogatory or not usually depends on the person. Chinese critics often refer to them using the homophone characters "" which are pronounced identically but translate to "shit-youth". This is often changed further to fènfèn as a derogatory nickname.

Development 
The phenomenon of fenqing arose after the "reform and opening up" of the Chinese government, during the period of fast economic development that occurred in China. Some people argue  that fenqing are a natural reaction to recent neoconservatism in Japan and the neoconservatism in the United States. Fenqing and these foreign neo-conservative elements intensely dislike each other, but all of them share certain similarities: distrust of foreign powers, support for the military and boundary disputes, etc. However, fenqing are not to be confused with Chinese neoconservatives, who espouse a more pragmatic and gradualist approach to political reforms and favor the development of an "East Asian Community" with Japan and Korea, an idea that is anathema to the fenqing 

As a group, fenqing are very diverse in their opinions. However, they are usually nationalistic and patriotic,  are often left-wing in political ideology, and tend to defend Mao Zedong's controversial actions during the Great Leap Forward and the Cultural Revolution.  The fenqing are very much concerned with political issues, especially in domestic policy relating to Tibet and foreign policy relating to Japan, Taiwan, or the United States.

They often harbour negative attitudes towards Japan due to the invasion and occupation of China by Imperial Japan, and support aggressive political stances towards Japan. For example, many believe that the Japanese government's apologies for Japanese war crimes are insincere and inadequate (some even believe no apologies will ever be adequate). More recent incidents, such a former Japanese prime minister's patronage of the Yasukuni Shrine, territorial disputes surrounding the Senkaku Islands (known as Diaoyu in China), and the revisions of history textbooks by uyoku dantai (Japanese right-wing extremists), lead these young people to conclude that the Japanese government is again seeking to expand militarily. These anti-Japanese sentiments are not necessarily only directed against the Japanese government and military, but often fiercely towards the Japanese culture, economy, and people.

Fenqing also refers to "20-somethings often use the Internet to publicly express their views on politics and society."

Characteristics 

Some support Chinese boycotts of Japanese products, for historical reasons and in response to the events described above. They may dislike Chinese Japanophiles and other Chinese who are more Westernized and free-market oriented, calling them Hanjian ("Chinese traitors").

Some fenqing view Taiwan as a part of China, and believe that Taiwan independence should be prevented by any means necessary. Many tend to consider war to be feasible, if not immediately necessary. A few may even favor the use of nuclear weapons against Taiwan.

Some view American or Western attention to issues such as human rights, Falun Gong, Tibet, etc. as attempts to undermine the rise of China. Most support the ideal of democracy, but view Western attempts to spread democracy as self-serving, subversive propaganda. However, only a few truly believe in communism.

In May 1999, China's embassy's was bombed in the Republic of Yugoslavia by American army. This event irritated the “angry youth” and they made remonstration to it. Chinese hackers attacked many American websites. In the demonstrations, the most eye-catching slogans calling for a boycott included ‘Burn all McDonald’s in China’ and ‘Damage American intellectual property by practical action: free provision of pirated software’.  After the Hainan Island incident in April 2001, hackers in both countries began their fight again. Most of the “angry youth” believe that the United States doesn't want China to develop.

Some have the view that the Chinese Communist government is invincible and justified at all cases. They may unconditionally defend all action by the Communist Party of China, or by Mao Zedong against countries they feel that "threaten China's rise". However, others simply defend the Chinese government because they believe it to be better than an alternative government which they believe would be dominated by Westerners.

Some are very passionate about irredentist claims. In addition to the official claims made by the People's Republic of China, such as Taiwan, Arunachal Pradesh, the Senkaku Islands, and the South China Sea Islands, some fenqing also make irredentist claims to Outer Mongolia, Tuva, Outer Manchuria, the Hukawng Valley of northern Myanmar, parts of Central Asia east of Lake Balkhash, Bhutan, Ladakh, and Sikkim.

They generally abhor political corruption within the government and government organizations. Many fenqing care greatly about the poor and believe they are the voice of the poor, advocating social security policies, and despise what they call the "elites" of China. Most fenqing are highly skeptical about the free market and often blame it as the source of corruption, social inequalities and the weakening of the central government. They also generally perceive the government as being too nice or ineffectual in a variety of issues, such as the Taiwan Straits, relations with Japan or the U.S., and Tibetan and Xinjiang independence.  For some their role models are Lu Xun and the activists of the May Fourth Movement. Some fenqing believe if Lu Xun were still alive today, he would continue fiercely criticizing the government.

The Chinese Communist party does not officially espouse Han chauvinism. It espouses Zhonghua minzu nationalism, which emphasizes assimilation into a modern nation of multiethnic origins, and emphasizes the Zhonghua nation's modern-era struggles against the "Imperialists": the West and Japan, and the historical multiethnic Zhonghua nation's insistence on unity under a single imperial state.

Militant nationalist websites, whether Zhonghua or Han, are often suppressed by the government because they appear to be elevating popular discussions into political levels. The government simply has a habit of clamping down on any kind of political discussions to prevent them from becoming ideologies that can replace official Zhonghua-Marxo-Capitalism.

Zhonghua nationalist websites tend to style themselves as "ultra-left socialist", venerating Mao as an anti-colonial icon over his capitalist successors, and identify Japan and US as their prime enemies, and focus very heavily on the goal of militarily invading Taiwan. Uyghurs and Tibetans are discussed as if they are mainly law-abiding Zhonghua citizens, with a minority elements instigated by overseas "separatist exiles".

See also 

Angry white man – a similar phenomenon among white American and Australian men
Baizuo
Brothers and Uncles of Victoria Park (Hong Kong)
Chinese Exclusion Act
Chinese nationalism
Gammon
Idaenam (South Korea)
Netto-uyoku (Japan)
Red Guards
Stereotypes of East Asians in the United States
Vatnik

References

Further reading 
 

Chinese words and phrases
Chinese culture
Chinese nationalism